Only God Can Judge Me is the eighth  studio album by  American hip hop recording artist Master P, released on October 26, 1999 by No Limit Records, Priority Records and EMI. It was produced by Carlos Stephens, XL, Ke'Noe, Sons Of Funk, Jermaine Dupri, and features several guest contributions from fellow  American rappers such as Nas, Jermaine Dupri, Mac, Silkk the Shocker, Mystikal and Magic.

Background
It marked Master P's return to rap as a solo artist after the chart-topping "MP Da Last Don" in 1998. Videos were released for the two singles "Step to Dis" and "Da Ballers".

Commercial performance
It has been certified Gold by the RIAA for shipments of 500,000 units.

Track listing 

Samples
Ghetto Prayer interpolates Aaliyah's "If Your Girl Only Knew".

Personnel
Aswad - Composer  
C-Murder -  Primary Artist  
Jodi Cohen - Design, Layout Design  
De'Mond -  Guest Artist, Performer, Primary Artist  
Jermaine Dupri - Guest Artist,  Producer  
Ghetto Commission - Performer, Primary Artist  
Ke'Noe - Producer  
Ricco Lumpkins - Engineer, Producer  
M.A.C. - Guest Artist, Primary Artist  
Magic - Guest Artist, Primary Artist  
Master P-   Executive Producer, Performer  
Mercedes - Primary Artist  
Ms. Peaches - Primary Artist  
Mystikal -  Primary Artist  
Nas - Guest Artist
Porsha - Primary Artist  
Rappin' 4-Tay - Vocals  
Donald "XL" Robertson  Producer  
Silkk the Shocker - Guest Artist, Primary artist 
Sons of Funk -  Vocals  
Carlos Stephens - Arranger, Mixing, Producer  
Suga Bear - Producer, Vocals

Charts

Weekly charts

Year-end charts

Certifications

Singles
Step To Dis

See also
 List of number-one R&B albums of 1999 (U.S.)

References

Master P albums
1999 albums
No Limit Records albums